This is a list of fictional characters from DC Comics who are or have been enemies of the Justice Society of America. In chronological order (with issue and date of first appearance).

Golden Age

Silver Age

Bronze Age

Modern Age

See also
List of Justice League enemies
List of Batman family enemies
List of Superman enemies
List of Wonder Woman enemies
List of Flash enemies
List of Green Lantern enemies
List of Captain Marvel enemies
List of Aquaman enemies
List of Green Arrow enemies
List of Hawkman enemies
List of Plastic Man enemies

References

 
Justice Society of America enemies
Justice Society of America enemies